Elvir Mehdi Maloku (born 14 May 1996) is an Albanian professional footballer who plays as a winger for Cypriot club PAEEK.

Club career

Early career
Born in Rijeka into an ethnic Albanian family, Maloku passed through various clubs in his native region where he had started his career with NK Lokomotiva Rijeka in 2004 and moved in 2007 to NK Stari Grad Rijeka, before moving to the youth setup of the local Prva HNL side HNK Rijeka in early 2012. In the 2012–13 season, he was the top scorer of the club's under-17 team, scoring 13 goals in 26 appearances. In February 2013, Maloku had a successful trial at Italian giants Juventus F.C. but talks over potential signing were ultimately called off.

Hajduk Split
In the summer of 2013, Maloku moved to HNK Hajduk Split along with his younger brother Trojan. He made his first team debut on 28 August 2013 in his team's 3-1 away win against NK Lokomotiva Zagreb, coming in the 83rd minute for Anton Maglica.

During his first two seasons under coach Igor Tudor, Maloku was used mostly as a bench player. His pace would sometimes prove good in the last minutes of the game. When Damir Burić took over the club in 2015, Maloku made his way into the first lineup but after some bad performances, he was benched again and used as a substitute. Out of his 69 total caps for Hajduk, he made it only 13 times in the starting lineup and was used 35 times as a substitute. In only 4 matches during his Hajduk career, he managed to play the entire game for 90 minutes. After the end of the season, he was released by Hajduk and given the option to search for his new club.

Gimnàstic
On 18 July 2016, Maloku signed a four-year contract with Spanish Segunda División club Gimnàstic de Tarragona. Then on 7 January, after being rarely used in the league, he was loaned to AEK Larnaca until June 2018.

On 23 August 2018, he was loaned out to NK Aluminij for the rest of the season.

Olimpia Grudziądz
In September 2019, Maloku signed with Polish side Olimpia Grudziądz. His contract with the club was terminated on August 1, 2020.

Dečić Tuzi
Maloku spent the first part of the 2020-21 season without a club, before signing for FK Dečić in Montenegro.

Opatija
In June 2021, Maloku was presented as a new NK Opatija player in June 2021.

International career

Croatia 
Maloku was a Croatian youth international, playing for the under-17 team in the 2013 FIFA U-17 World Cup in the summer of 2013 and several matches for the under-19 team and the under-21 team.

Albania 
He was eligible to play for Albania at international level due to his parents origin. He accepted the invitation from head coach Skënder Gega to play for Albania national under-21 football team in 2015, later stating that he intends to play for Albania at senior level should a chance arise. He was called up for the friendly matches against Kazakhstan and Sweden on 12 and 16 June 2015 respectively, but his appearance for the team was thwarted by club duties with Hajduk Split.

Following arrival of Alban Bushi as a head coach of Albania U21, Maloku was re-invited to Albania U21. In a press conference later, Bushi stated that Maloku would be given the Albanian citizenship to make him eligible for Albania U21 in the 2019 UEFA European Under-21 Championship qualification. Maloku was given the Albanian citizenship by president Bujar Nishani.

2019 UEFA European Under-21 Championship qualification
Maloku was called up for the friendly match against France U21 on 5 June 2017 and the 2019 UEFA European Under-21 Championship qualification opening match against Estonia U21 on 12 June 2017. On 7 June 2017, FIFA granted Maloku clearance to start for Albania U21 in competitive matches. However, a day before the opening match of the qualifiers against Estonia U21, Maloku suffered a late injury which made him miss the match.

Career statistics

Club

Honours

Club
Hajduk Split
 Croatian Super Cup Runner-up: 2013

AEK Larnaca
 Cypriot First Division Runner-up: 2016–17
 Cypriot Cup: 2017–18

References

External links

Elvir Maloku at hajduk.hr

 Elvir Maloku profile at FSHF.org

1996 births
Living people
Footballers from Rijeka
Croatian people of Albanian descent
Association football wingers
Croatian footballers
Croatia youth international footballers
Albanian footballers
Albania under-21 international footballers
HNK Hajduk Split players
Gimnàstic de Tarragona footballers
AEK Larnaca FC players
NK Aluminij players
Olimpia Grudziądz players
FK Dečić players
NK Opatija players
PAEEK players
Croatian Football League players
Segunda División players
Cypriot First Division players
Slovenian PrvaLiga players
I liga players
Montenegrin First League players
First Football League (Croatia) players
Albanian expatriate footballers
Expatriate footballers in Spain
Albanian expatriate sportspeople in Spain
Expatriate footballers in Cyprus
Albanian expatriate sportspeople in Cyprus
Expatriate footballers in Slovenia
Albanian expatriate sportspeople in Slovenia
Expatriate footballers in Poland
Albanian expatriate sportspeople in Poland
Expatriate footballers in Montenegro
Albanian expatriate sportspeople in Montenegro